The Upper Grindelwald Glacier (German: Oberer Grindelwaldgletscher) is one of the two valley glaciers near Grindelwald on the northern side of the Bernese Alps, in the Canton of Berne (the other being the Lower Grindelwald Glacier).

The Upper Grindelwald Glacier arises from a vast snow field north of the Schreckhorn and south of the Wetterhorn.

See also
List of glaciers in Switzerland
List of glaciers
Retreat of glaciers since 1850
Swiss Alps

External links
Swiss glacier monitoring network

Glaciers of the canton of Bern
Glaciers of the Alps
Grindelwald
GUpperGrindelwald